Amphilius krefftii is a species of catfish in the genus Amphilius. It is found in the Galana River basin in Kenya, and the Sigi River, Pangani River, and Lake Jipe basins in Tanzania. Its length reaches 20.8 cm.

References 

krefftii
Fish described in 1911
Taxa named by George Albert Boulenger
Freshwater fish of Africa